Lioptilodes zapalaicus is a species of moth in the genus Lioptilodes known from Argentina and Peru. Moths of this species take flight in October, December, January, and April, and have a wingspan of approximately 18–21 millimetres.

References

Platyptiliini
Moths described in 1991
Taxa named by Cees Gielis